Dr. Joe Wolemonwu (also known as Dr. Joseph Wolemonwu) is an accomplished author, innovator, educator and ardent knowledge management practitioner. He has gained professional experience in different organizations, such as Exxon Mobil Corporation, Marine Corps Community Service (MCCS) and U.S. Department of the Treasury, and the Government of the District of Columbia. Additionally, he has authored multiple books, including "Leveraging Knowledge Management For Efficient Customer Service" and "Team Lead Model of Self-leadership". 

Dr. Joe Wolemonwu has been recognized by the Department of Veterans Affairs (VA) - Office of Information & Technology for his work in knowledge management strategy. He holds a Doctor of Business Administration (DBA) degree from Liberty University, Lynchburg, VA, and currently serves as an Online Adjunct Professor and a doctoral chair at Liberty University, Lynchburg, VA, and the University of the People in Pasadena, CA.

Education 
Dr. Joseph Wolemonwu holds a Bachelor of Science degree in Accounting, a Master of Business Administration degree, and a Doctor of Business Administration. He holds professional certificates in Strategic Management and Multi-Criteria Decision Making Process.

Professional achievements 
Dr. Joseph Wolemonwu co-founded the Association of Certified Knowledge Management Professionals (ACKMP) in December 2016 and currently serves as the Board Chairman and Executive Director. He has demonstrated proficiency in leadership and knowledge management, having established effective leadership models and programs and developed critical Knowledge Management software. Moreover, he has been invited to speak as a guest at numerous leadership summits and Information Technology Expos held in Virginia. 

Dr. Joe Wolemonwu is a practicing project manager who holds a Project Management Professional (PMP) certification. He is a member of the Project Management Institute (PMI).

Innovative leadership model 
Dr. Wolemonwu is known for developing a Team Lead model of Self-leadership, an eight-step model that gives every leader the tools to move their organization forward. This model is designed to help leaders accelerate progress in all areas of their organization. The model emphasizes the importance of how leaders interact with others and how to bring people together to achieve positive change. Furthermore, Dr. Wolemonwu highlights the significance of reflective practice as a means to enhance leadership skills.

Research and publications 
Dr. Joseph Wolemonwu conducted a qualitative research case study as a doctoral candidate. This research focused on the influence of self-leadership on team-building abilities among leaders within a Department of Defense (DOD) component located in Quantico, Virginia. The study recommends that businesses and organizational leaders develop self-leadership training curricula in leadership development programs.

Dr. Wolemonwu authored the book "Leveraging Knowledge Management for Efficient Customer Service", which highlights the negative impact of poor customer service on organizational growth. The sequel to the book focused on the topic of effective customer service that is required for any career.

References

External link 
Joe Wolemonwu Website